The V-lip redhorse (Moxostoma pappillosum) is a species of freshwater catostomid fish from Eastern North America. It inhabits drainages on the Atlantic Slope between Virginia and South Carolina.

Relationship with human 
The IGFA all tackle world record for the species stands at 1lb 0oz taken from the Green River in North Carolina in 2018.

Footnotes

References 

Moxostoma
Fish described in 1870